The 2020 NASCAR Pinty's FanCave Challenge was the fourteenth season of the Pinty's Series, the national stock car racing series in Canada sanctioned by NASCAR. It began with the QwickWick 125 at Sunset Speedway on August 15 and concluded with the Pinty's 125 at Jukasa Motor Speedway on September 28.

Andrew Ranger entered the season as the defending drivers' champion, however he did not compete in any races. Jason Hathaway was declared the Pinty's FanCave Challenge Championship winner for finishing first in the point standings.

Drivers

Schedule
On 5 December 2019, NASCAR announced the 2020 schedule. It included an inaugural race at Ohsweken Speedway, which would have become the first dirt track race in series history. The COVID-19 pandemic caused the series to make considerable schedule and format changes. The season was ultimately contested over three weekends at three different tracks, with each track holding 125 lap doubleheader races.

Results and standings

Races

Drivers' championship

(key) Bold – Pole position awarded by time. Italics – Pole position set by final practice results or Owners' points. * – Most laps led.

See also

 2020 NASCAR Cup Series
 2020 NASCAR Xfinity Series
 2020 NASCAR Gander RV & Outdoors Truck Series
 2020 ARCA Menards Series
 2020 ARCA Menards Series East
 2020 ARCA Menards Series West
 2020 NASCAR Whelen Modified Tour
 2020 NASCAR Whelen Euro Series
 2020 eNASCAR iRacing Pro Invitational Series
 2020 EuroNASCAR Esports Series

References

External links

Pinty's Series Standings and Statistics for 2020

Pinty's FanCave Challenge